Ruby Dam may refer to several dams:

Ruby Dam, a variant name for Ross Dam
Ruby Dam (Montana), a dam on the Ruby River